"First Date" is a song recorded by American rock band Blink-182 for their fourth studio album, Take Off Your Pants and Jacket (2001). It was released as the second single from the album on October 8, 2001. It was written primarily by guitarist Tom DeLonge, with additional songwriting credit to bassist Mark Hoppus, and drummer Travis Barker. "First Date" centers on the awkwardness and complicated emotions two individuals can experience upon initial meeting. DeLonge based the song on memories of his initial courtship with then-spouse Jennifer Jenkins.

The song's creation stems from Blink-182 manager Rick DeVoe's opinion that the album lacked a catchy, "feel-good" song. DeLonge composed "First Date" in response, while bassist Mark Hoppus composed the album's lead single "The Rock Show". The song's music video depicts the trio as hippies in the 1970s, parading around the suburbs in a Volkswagen van and visiting a water park.

The song spent nearly half a year on Billboard Modern Rock Tracks chart, where it peaked at number six; internationally, it was a top five hit on the UK Rock Chart, and reached the top 40 on the all-genre UK Singles Chart, as well as in Flanders and Scotland. Music critics were generally mixed in their reception, with many considering it unimaginative. In promotion of the single, Blink-182 performed the song live on late-night talk show Late Night with Conan O'Brien, and at the 2001 MTV Europe Music Awards.

Background
Prior to recording their fourth studio album, Take Off Your Pants and Jacket, Blink-182 recorded demos at DML Studios, a small practice studio in Escondido, California, where the band had written Dude Ranch and Enema of the State. The group had written a dozen songs after three weeks and invited their manager, Rick DeVoe, to be the first person outside Blink-182 to hear the new material, which the band found "catchy [but with] a definitive edge". DeVoe sat in the control room and quietly listened to the recordings, and pressed the band at the end on why there was no "Blink-182 good-time summer anthem [thing]". DeLonge and Hoppus were furious, remarking, "You want a fucking single? I'll write you the cheesiest, catchiest, throwaway fucking summertime single you've ever heard!" Hoppus went home and wrote "The Rock Show" in ten minutes, and DeLonge similarly wrote "First Date", which became the most successful singles from the record and future live staples. The song's arrangement was worked in the Famous Stars and Straps warehouse in San Diego.

The song was inspired by DeLonge's then-wife, Jennifer Jenkins, who he wed in 2001. When they were first dating, their first outing was to SeaWorld San Diego. DeLonge remembered how awkward it was: "We just hung out and walked around looking at fish." He pulled from these experiences to write the tune, a summary of "going on a first date with a girl and not necessarily knowing how to act, what to wear or what to say."

Reception
Joshua Klein of The Washington Post found the track "immediately likable," if innocuous, while Gina Vivinetto of Tampa Bay Times called the song a "tender tune." Darren Ratner, reviewing for Allmusic, writes that the song serves as "therapy for post-pubescent dilemma," adding that he found it "sharp, if not entertaining." Aaron Scott of Slant Magazine expressed the belief that the "biggest chunk of the record-buying public is just the right age to relate to their songs about first dates," viewing its parent album on the whole monotonous. Nick Hornby, writing for The New Yorker, said the song proceeds "straightforwardly and unimaginatively." Chuck Taylor at Billboard was dismissive, commenting, "Fans will dig it — otherwise it's business as usual for a band who's made the most of its 15 minutes."

Commercial performance
"First Date" was serviced as a single in Europe in October 2001, and in North America in January 2002. It debuted on Billboard Modern Rock Tracks chart in the issue dated February 2, 2002 at position 25; it began collecting significant airplay two weeks later. It first hit the top ten in the week ending March 16, and reached its peak at number six during the week of April 6, where it remained for four weeks. It dropped out of the top ten in the week ending May 11, and fell off the ranking after 25 weeks, on July 27, 2002.

Music video

The music video for "First Date" pays homage to 1970s culture, featuring the band acting as long-haired hippie versions of themselves. Clad in long wigs, bell-bottoms and butterfly collars, the trio drive around a quiet suburb in a Volkswagen van, making stops at a diner and water park. The video, directed by The Malloys, was filmed over three days in Tsawwassen, British Columbia, and performance footage was filmed in a garage decorated with 1970s paraphernalia. Singer Jordan Pundik and guitarist Chad Gilbert of New Found Glory, with whom the band were touring at the time, make cameo appearances in the clip. Journalist Joe Shooman interpreted the video as a retelling of the film Dazed and Confused. Elements of the clip's concept stemmed from DeLonge, who viewed a documentary on the Bee Gees and found their hair and clothing outrageous: "I called up Mark and was like, 'Dude you've got to watch this shit.' These dudes are on top of a mountain, singing face to face, with the sunset behind them," he recounted. The video debuted on MTV's Total Request Live on January 18, 2002; it was added to the playlists of MuchMusic in Canada during the week of February 9, 2002, and the College Television Network on March 16. As its radio performance peaked, it attracted airplay on MTV; it was first listed on Billboard Video Monitor, ranking the most-played clips on television stations, in the week of April 20, 2002.

A shot from the video, where DeLonge's character Boomer mouths the phrase "what the fuck", became a popular GIF online in the late 2010s. In addition, DeLonge's company, To the Stars, has produced merchandise based on the Boomer character. In 2021, DeLonge would create and play a new character by the name of Disco that is said to be Boomer's older brother. Disco was featured in the music video for the song "Losing My Mind" by DeLonge's other band, Angels & Airwaves.

Track listing

Charts

Certifications

References

External links

2001 singles
Blink-182 songs
Songs written by Tom DeLonge
Songs written by Travis Barker
Songs written by Mark Hoppus
Music videos directed by The Malloys
MCA Records singles
2001 songs